Skyline Mall was a small enclosed shopping mall located among the high rises of Bailey's Crossroads in Falls Church, Virginia. It opened on the site of the former Washington-Virginia Airport and the Sunset X-rated drive-in theater. in 1977 to join the offices of Skyline City. At its peak, the mall comprised more than thirty tenants, including a Safeway supermarket and Rite Aid drugstore, and a twelve-screen cinema. Other major chain tenants that formerly operated at the mall included Dress Barn and B. Dalton.  The mall was purchased in 2002 by discount retailer Target Corporation, who replaced the majority of the complex (except for a fitness center on the second level) with a Target store.

References

Shopping malls in Virginia
Demolished shopping malls in the United States
Economy of Fairfax County, Virginia
Shopping malls established in 1977
Shopping malls disestablished in 2002
1977 establishments in Virginia
2002 disestablishments in Virginia